Great Britain and Northern Ireland competed at the 2022 World Athletics Championships in Eugene, United States, from 15 to 24 July 2022. Great Britain and Northern Ireland have entered 36 athletes.

Medallists

* – Indicates the athlete competed in preliminaries but not the final

Results

Men 
Track and road events

* – Indicates the athlete competed in preliminaries but not the final

 Field events

Women 
Track and road events

* – Indicates the athlete competed in preliminaries but not the final

 Field events

 Combined events – Heptathlon

Mixed

References

External links
Oregon22｜WCH 22｜World Athletics

Nations at the 2022 World Athletics Championships
World Championships in Athletics
Great Britain and Northern Ireland at the World Championships in Athletics